Razali Saad (born 14 August 1964) is a Singaporean football defender who played for Singapore in the 1984 Asian Cup.

References

External links
Stats at RSSSF

1964 births
1984 AFC Asian Cup players
Living people
Singaporean footballers
Singapore international footballers
Singapore FA players
Southeast Asian Games silver medalists for Singapore
Southeast Asian Games medalists in football
Association football defenders
Competitors at the 1985 Southeast Asian Games